Bondage pornography is the depiction of sexual bondage or other BDSM activities using photographs, stories, films or drawings. Though often described as pornography, the genre involves the presentation of bondage fetishism or BDSM scenarios and does not necessarily involve the commonly understood pornographic styles. In fact, the genre is primarily interested with the presentation of a bondage scene and less with depictions of sexuality, such as nudity or sex scenes, which may be viewed as a distraction from the aesthetics and eroticism of the sex scenario itself.

Historically, most subjects of bondage imagery have been women, and the genre has been criticized for promoting misogynistic attitudes and violence against women.

Magazines and comics

Variety
In the early 20th century, bondage imagery was available through "detective magazines", and comic books often featured characters being tied up or tying others up, particularly in "damsel in distress" plots.

There were also a number of dedicated fetish magazines which featured images of fetishism and bondage. The first of such magazines in the United States was Bizarre, first published in 1946 by fetish photographer John Willie (the phallic pseudonym of John Coutts), who developed the concept in the 1920s. Willie was able to avoid controversy in censorship through careful attention to guidelines and the use of humor. Publication of Bizarre was suspended completely from 1947 to 1951 because of post-War paper shortages. By 1956 Willie was ready to give up the magazine, and in that year he sold it to someone described only as R.E.B., who published six more issues before Bizarre finally folded in 1959.

Willie is better remembered for his Sweet Gwendoline comic strips, in which Gwendoline is drawn as a rather naïve blonde "damsel in distress", with ample curves, who is unfortunate enough to find herself tied up in scene after scene by the raven-haired dominatrix and the mustachioed villain "Sir Dystic D'Arcy". She is rescued and also repeatedly tied up (though for benevolent reasons) by secret agent U-69 (censored to U89 in some editions). The comic strips were published largely in the 1950s and 60s. The story was published as a piecemeal serial, appearing usually two pages at a time in several different magazines over the years.

Though Bizarre was a small format magazine, it had a huge impact on later kink publications, such as ENEG's fetish magazine, Exotique, published 1956–1959. Exotique was entirely devoted to fetish fashions and female-dominant bondage fantasies. The 36 issues featured photos and illustrations of dominatrix-inspired vamps (including Burtman's wife Tana Louise and iconic model Bettie Page) wearing exotic leather and rubber ensembles, corsets, stockings/garters, boots, and high heels. Gene Bilbrew contributed illustrations to the magazine. The articles, many written by Leonard Burtman, using an alias, covered various aspects of sadomasochism and transvestism, with men depicted as slaves to imperious, all-powerful women. Exotique had no nudity, pornographic content, or even sexually suggestive situations. Nevertheless, much like fellow publisher Irving Klaw, in 1957, Burtman would be targeted as a pornographer. He was relentlessly pursued by the U.S. Postal Inspection Service (acting as a censorship agency under the Comstock laws) and local law enforcement (which functioned in coordination with Postal Inspectors and the Catholic Church). Eventually, he was arrested, his magazines and materials confiscated, and brought to trial. This led to the demise of the magazine in 1959. However, starting in 1960, Burtman (under a different imprint) would go on to publish many more fetish magazines that were nearly identical to Exotique such as New Exotique, Masque, Connoisseur, Bizarre Life, High Heels, Unique World, Corporal (a pioneering spanking-fetish magazine) and others well into the 1970s.

New York photographer Irving Klaw also published illustrated adventure/bondage serials by fetish artists Eric Stanton, Gene Bilbrew, Adolfo Ruiz and others. Klaw is best known for operating an international mail-order business selling photographs and film of attractive women (sometimes in bondage) from the 1940s to the 1960s. His most famous bondage model was Bettie Page, who became the first celebrity of bondage film and photography.

These publications disappeared for a time with a crackdown on pornography in the late 1950s.

Resurgence of bondage magazines
Dedicated bondage magazines again became popular in America in the 1970s. Publishers of bondage magazines included Harmony Concepts, the House of Milan and Lyndon Distributors. House of Milan have since been purchased by Lyndon Distributors.

These magazines were not generally available through mainstream distributors, and were sold either in sex shops or by mail order. They contained little advertising content, and were entirely dependent on sales.

Typically, each magazine consisted of several multi-page pictorials of tied-up women, often with a fictional narrative attached, and one fictional story of three or four pages in length. Sometimes pictorials were replaced by artwork by a fetish artist or included an interview with one of the performers in the industry. In the case of House of Milan and Lyndon Distributors, the magazines were simply illustrated text versions of videos published by the same title. Such practice cut costs and allowed a streamlined output of material.

Another type of magazine was the "compendium magazine", usually consisting of a large number of individual photographs drawn from previous magazines, without any linking story.

Because of their relatively small circulation, compared with mainstream pornography, most bondage magazines were printed in black and white, except for the cover and centerfold. In the 1980s and 1990s, experiments were made with adding more color content, but most magazine content remained black and white.

The attitude of some of the early magazines could be regarded as misogynistic, in spite of editorial disclaimers that the magazines represented only fantasies, as the storylines deviated from the old-fashioned "damsel in distress" motif towards more restrictive and explicit BDSM practices. However, in reality the opposite effect often happened: as a bondage performer was cast in more material and engaged in more acts, she would often develop a stronger fan base and became a recognized star in her own right. Nikki Dial and Ashley Renee are two examples of performers who won awards for their work as subs in bondage videos, and typically endured the most onscreen punishment.

In the 1990s, as homosexuality and bi-sexuality began to be more socially accepted, magazine publishers started to produce femdom material depicting men in bondage, as well as portraying female models as participants in mutually satisfying bondage games, usually with at least one actress performing as a dom and at least one as a sub. Sometimes, the roles of dom and sub would be reversed. Be Be LeBadd and Alexis Payne are two professional dominatrices who also sometimes found themselves on the receiving end of a whip.

Websites and imagery in mainstream pornography

From the late 1990s onwards, specialist BDSM pornographic websites such as Insex and the various websites of Kink.com appeared. As Internet pornography became more widely available, the bondage magazine market began to decrease. As of 2003, specialist bondage magazines were mostly displaced by bondage material on the Internet, and bondage imagery is to be found in mainstream pornographic magazines, such as Nugget and Hustler'''s Taboo magazine.

However, the tradition of bondage magazines continues in the form of "art books" of bondage photographs, published by mainstream publishers such as Taschen.

Certain websites have begun providing bondage videos and photographs featuring the kidnapping roleplay, which has been largely the hallmark of "detective" style bondage magazines. These styles are much closer to the style of bondage scenes in mainstream television.

Criticism
As the availability of free pornography on the Internet has increased, its possible effects on microaggression towards women have been discussed. The concern has been raised that since bondage pornography mostly depicts women (who are portrayed primarily in situations of female submission), such pornography may promote an attitude legitimising violence against women.

The book series and film 50 Shades of Grey has been said to perpetuate misogyny and portray BDSM/bondage subcultures in a patriarchal and misogynistic light. In this view, to properly reflect the BDSM/bondage subculture it is necessary for pornography to "focus on mutual consent, mutual power, and communication," as in the film 50 Shades of Dylan Ryan''. BDSM is an initialism for "bondage and discipline, sadism and masochism" and can also include other D/s (dominance and submission) practices. Since consent, communication, and equal power exchange are fundamental in the BDSM subculture, pornography that is made can ultimately be used as educational for the inquiring practitioner.

See also
 Fetish model
 Irving Klaw
 Japanese bondage
 Kink.com 
 List of fetish artists
 Sadism and masochism in fiction
 Splatter film
 Sexual fetishism

References

External links
 "Between the Rubber Sheets: A Look at Modern Fetish Magazines", essay by D.K. Holm

 
Pornography
Pornography by genre